The Republic of Poland Ambassador to Montenegro is Poland's foremost diplomatic representative in Montenegro and head of the Poland's diplomatic mission in Podgorica.

History 
Poland established diplomatic relations with Montenegro shortly after it gained independence in 2006. In 2008 Poland opened its embassy in Podgorica.

List of ambassadors of Poland to Montenegro 

 2006 – 2011: Jarosław Lindenberg (chargé d’affaires)
 2011 – 2015: Grażyna Sikorska
 2015 – 2017: Irena Tatarzyńska
 since 2018: Artur Dmochowski

See also 

 List of diplomatic missions of Poland

References 

Montenegro
Poland